Culture II is the third studio album by American hip hop trio Migos. It was released on January 26, 2018, by Capitol Records, Motown and Quality Control Music. Culture II is a double album consisting of 24 tracks, and features guest appearances from 21 Savage, Drake, Gucci Mane, Travis Scott, Ty Dolla Sign, Big Sean, Nicki Minaj, Cardi B, Post Malone and 2 Chainz. It was executive produced by Quavo, alongside production work from a variety of collaborators including Metro Boomin, Buddah Bless, Kanye West, Pharrell Williams and Murda Beatz, among others. The album serves as a sequel to Migos' previous album, Culture.

Culture II was supported by four singles: "MotorSport", "Stir Fry", "Walk It Talk It" and "Narcos", as well as the promotional single, "Supastars". The album received generally positive reviews from critics and debuted at number one on the US Billboard 200. It is Migos' second US number-one album.

Background
In July 2017, a rumor surfaced that Culture II was on a hard drive that was lost by Quavo. Migos confirmed that a single from the album will be dropping soon and was previewed on Rap-Up. Anticipation regarding the upcoming album built due to the Atlanta rap group's use of social media. Posts included many names such as Kanye West, Donald Glover and others who they have worked with, and revealed on January 22 that West helped produce the album.

On November 21, 2017, through a New York Times story on the group, it was revealed that the updated release date for the album was January 2018; earlier reports suggested an October release. Quavo announced on January 8 that he and DJ Durel were mixing the album. On January 15, 2018, Migos announced the release date of January 26 via their official social media accounts. The same day, Quavo posted a snippet of the song "Culture National Anthem". Merchandise for the album has been released within Bloomingdale's 'Music Is Universal' pop-up space in conjunction with Universal Music Group.

Migos' DJ known as DJ Durel says that group only spend 20 to 45 minutes to do each song. He also stated "when they're in the zone, there's no way you can stop them from laying down a good song. It's going to come out perfect. It's not going to come out rushed or anything".

Promotion

Singles
The album's lead single, "MotorSport", was released on October 27, 2017, and includes lead vocals from Cardi B and Nicki Minaj. The song is produced by Murda Beatz and Cubeatz. The song peaked at number six on the US Billboard Hot 100.

The album's second single, "Stir Fry", was released on December 20, 2017. The song is produced by Pharrell Williams. It peaked at number eight on the Billboard Hot 100.

The album's third single, "Walk It Talk It" featuring Drake, was sent to urban contemporary radio on March 18, 2018, the same day as the release of the official music video. The song peaked at number 10 on the Billboard Hot 100.

The music video for the song, "Narcos", was released on June 27, 2018. It was later sent to US rhythmic contemporary radio on July 24, 2018, as the album's fourth single. The song initially peaked at number 36 on the Billboard Hot 100.

Promotional singles
"Supastars" was released as a promotional single on January 22, 2018, shortly after premiering on Zane Lowe's Beats 1 radio. The song is produced by Honorable C.N.O.T.E., Buddah Bless, Quavo and DJ Durel. It peaked at number 53 on the Billboard Hot 100.

Critical reception

Culture II was met with generally positive reviews. At Metacritic, which assigns a normalized rating out of 100 to reviews from professional publications, the album received an average score of 69, based on 19 reviews. Aggregator AnyDecentMusic? gave it 6.7 out of 10, based on their assessment of the critical consensus.

Dave Heaton of PopMatters praised the album saying, "While not all of these 24 songs are equally impressive, nothing about Culture II feels like they're going through the motions". Jordan Bassett of NME said, "Migos are firing on all cylinders here, their new record a lush, chaotic patchwork that pops with primary colours. The fab three have done it again". Alexis Petridis of The Guardian stated that "for such a gargantuan album, it's surprisingly light on its feet, skipping nimbly between musical styles", complimenting the album's production, but criticising the lyrical themes. Dan Weiss of Consequence said, "The trio gave a double album their best, with plenty of head-turning lines, hilarious stray shouts ("dinner rolls!" on "CC" is a fave), and productions that further dilate the luxury trap spectrum, but not wildly so". In his review, Neil Z. Yeung of AllMusic states, "With enough highlights to form a single digestible effort, Migos could have delivered another culture-defining classic with just a little trimming. Instead, they've taken what should have been a potent, big league statement and diluted it". Meaghan Garvey of Pitchfork said, "It's still a joy to hear the Migos rap, which is why it's especially depressing that Culture II ultimately feels like a drag—a formless grab bag compiled without much care". Scott Glaysher of XXL said, "Although the creative achievements aren't revolutionary, they are thorough and consistent".

In a mixed review, Rolling Stones Charles Aaron stated: "Culture II ultimately feels less like a celebratory howl from the mountaintop than a transitional inventory dump. With its easily-trimmable 24 tracks, Culture II appears to be tailored to finesse chart rules, which count 1,500 individual song streams toward one full album sale." In another mixed review, Exclaim!s Calum Slingerland stated: "Having more songs available to stream results in more royalties, though it doesn't equate to a flawless full-length." Kitty Empire of The Observer said, "Culture II was never going to be a modest affair, in which three self-effacing twentysomethings quietly enumerated their blessings. Apart from some anxiety ("Tryna be like the Carters/Gotta be like the Carters" – Too Playa) and exhaustion (Work Hard), Culture II is wall-to-wall diamonds, watches, cars, chains, brands, fashion houses and exotic fauna". Arcade of Sputnikmusic saying "Culture II sounds like a satire of every other rap album released by a major label these days, catering to the lowest common denominator of casual music listener. As a business decision, it's genius; as a piece of music, it's little more than an elaborate consumer scam".

Rankings
In The Wire magazine's annual critics' poll, British music critic Simon Reynolds named Culture II his favorite release of the year.

Commercial performance
Culture II debuted at number one on the US Billboard 200 with 199,000 album-equivalent units, of which 38,000 were pure album sales in its first week. It is Migos' second US number-one album. On December 14, 2018, Culture II was certified double platinum by the Recording Industry Association of America (RIAA) for combined sales, streaming and track-sales equivalent of two million units.

In 2018, Culture II was ranked as the tenth most popular album of the year on the Billboard 200. By the end of 2018, the album sold over 1,599,000 album-equivalent units in the US, with over 115,000 being pure sales.

Track listing

Notes
  signifies an additional producer
 "Narcos" features additional vocals from Filip Nikolic
 "Auto Pilot" was originally titled "Auto Pilot (Huncho on the Beat)"

Sample credits
 "BBO (Bad Bitches Only)" contains elements from "You've Got the Makings of a Lover", written by Earl Moss, as performed by the Festivals.
 "Stir Fry" contains an interpolation of "The Champ", written by Harry Palmer.
 "Crown the Kings" contains elements from "Get Up, Stand Up", written by Bob Marley and Peter Tosh, as performed by the Wailers.
 "Made Men" contains elements from "Schweet", written by Cornell Wheeler, Jr., from MSXII Sound Design Presents – Lofi Melodics 3.

Personnel
Credits adapted from the album's liner notes.

Musicians
 Danny Zook – guitar (track 1)
 Filip Nikolic – guitar (track 3)
 Mike Dean – keyboard (tracks 4, 10, 24), guitar (track 7), vocoder (tracks 7, 10)
 Lee Buddle – saxophone (track 21)

Technical
 Ethan Stevens – engineering (all tracks)
 Sean Phelan – engineering (all tracks)
 Daryl "DJ Durel" McPherson – engineering (all tracks), recording (tracks 1–24), mixing (tracks 1–8, 10–16, 18–24)
 Buster Ross – studio assistant (all tracks)
 Mike Dean – mixing (tracks 1–8, 10–16, 18–24), mastering (tracks 1–8, 10–16, 18–24)
 Quavo – mixing (tracks 1–8, 10–16, 18–24)
 Thomas "Tillie" Mann – recording (Offset) (tracks 7, 8), mixing (tracks 9, 17)
 Sean Paine – recording assistance (Offset) (track 8)
 Mike Larson – recording (track 9)
 Thomas Cullison – second recording (track 9)
 Leslie Brathwaite – mixing (track 9)
 Colin Leonard – mastering (tracks 9, 17)
 Aubry "Big Juice" Delaine – recording (Nicki Minaj) (track 17)
 Nick Valentin – recording assistance (Nicki Minaj) (track 17)
 Brian Judd – recording assistance (Nicki Minaj) (track 17)
 Jamil "Millz" Alleyne – tracking (track 20)
 Justin "JBTurnMeUp" Boggy – production mixing (track 20)

Additional personnel
 Stole "Moab" Stojmenov – art direction, design
 Danny Zook – sample clearance (Alien Music)
 Ron Cabiltes – sample clearance (Alien Music)

Charts

Weekly charts

Year-end charts

Decade-end charts

Certifications

References

2018 albums
Motown albums
Capitol Records albums
Migos albums
Sequel albums
Albums produced by Murda Beatz
Albums produced by Pharrell Williams
Albums produced by Honorable C.N.O.T.E.
Albums produced by Kanye West
Albums produced by Metro Boomin
Albums produced by Mike Dean (record producer)
Albums produced by Zaytoven
Albums produced by Travis Scott
Albums produced by Cubeatz
Quality Control Music albums
Albums produced by OG Parker